James Anson Farrer (24 July 1849 – 21 June 1925), best known as James A. Farrer was an English barrister and writer.

Biography

Farrer was born in London, his parents were Rev. Matthew Thomas Farrer and Mary Louisa Anson. He was educated at Balliol College, Oxford and worked as a barrister. He lived in Ingleborough and married Elizabeth Georgiana Anne in 1877.

He also worked as a JP in Westmorland.

Publications

Primitive Manners and Customs (1879)
Zululand and the Zulus (1879)
Crimes And Punishments (1880)
Military Manners and Customs (1885)
Paganism and Christianity (1891)
Books Condemned to be Burnt (1892)
Literary Forgeries (1907) [with an introduction by Andrew Lang]
The Monarchy in Politics (1917)
The War for Monarchy, 1793-1815 (1920)
England Under Edward VII (1922)

See also

High Sheriff of Yorkshire

References

External links 
 

1849 births
1925 deaths
Critics of Christianity
English barristers
English justices of the peace
English non-fiction writers
High Sheriffs of Yorkshire